Musselburgh Rugby Football Club is a rugby union club based in Musselburgh, East Lothian, Scotland.

Musselburgh RFC first applied to join the Edinburgh & District League in 1921 but it is believed that the town had a team for at least 20 years before that.

History

The club was formed in 1921 as a section of the Musselburgh Sports Club. They initially played their games at Shirehaugh which is now a practice green at The Musselburgh Golf Club in Monktonhall. During the 1930s The Musselburgh Sports Club changed its name to become Musselburgh Rugby Football Club in its entirety.

During 1951, the club moved from its home at Shirehaugh to a new pitch at Stoneyhill where the club currently resides. A clubhouse was built on the site and opened in 1971, with changing rooms added in 1984 and a gym added in 2021.

After the creation of the new leagues in Scotland the club were placed in the third division, ultimately falling to fifth division in 1975. However they bounced back and continued to climb up the leagues where they were promoted to the Premiership for the first time in 1987, lasting one season before being relegated.

The club continued to stay around the second and third tiers before a sharp fall to the regional leagues in the late 2000s. The team slowly climbed their way back up to the National leagues before winning National 2 in 2015. With the formation of the Super6 in 2018, the top six teams from National 1 had the chance to be promoted to the Premiership to join the remaining four teams. Musselburgh claimed a bonus point on the final day of the season to win the final spot.

Musselburgh Sevens

The club runs the Musselburgh Sevens tournament.

Honours

Scottish National League Division Two
 Champions (2): 1984–85, 2014–15
Musselburgh Sevens
 Champions: 1949, 1950, 1951, 1957, 1987, 1988, 1990, 1993, 1997, 2003, 2008, 2009, 2010, 2013, 2015, 2018, 2019
Highland Sevens
Champions: 1956, 1958, 1963, 1978, 1979
 Preston Lodge Sevens
 Champions: 1992, 1993
 Glasgow University Sevens
 Champions: 1957
 Kelso Harlequins Sevens
 Champions: 1990
 Haddington Sevens
 Champions: 1993, 1995
 North Berwick Sevens
 Champions: 2002, 2009, 2010, 2011, 2017, 2018, 2022
 Scottish Rugby Shield
 Runners-Up: (1) 2011-12
Kelso Sevens
 Champions (1): 1955
Peebles Sevens
 Champions (3): 1986, 1988, 1997
Walkerburn Sevens
 Champions (9): 1951, 1952, 1956, 1957, 1960, 1990, 1993, 2002, 2003
 Edinburgh Northern Sevens
 Champions (1): 2013

Notable former players

Ireland internationalists

Glasgow Warriors players

Edinburgh District

The following former Musselburgh players have represented Edinburgh District at provincial level.

References

 Massie, Allan A Portrait of Scottish Rugby (Polygon, Edinburgh)

External links
Official site
 
 

Rugby union in East Lothian
Scottish rugby union teams
Musselburgh